The discography of American singer Alexis Jordan consists of one studio album, six singles (including one as a featured artist) and five music videos.

Jordan rose to fame when she finished as a semi-finalalist on the first season of America's Got Talent in 2006. After being eliminated from the show, Jordan and her family moved to Mexico to be closer to the music industry. While there, she began to upload cover songs on YouTube while submitting demos. By 2008, Jordan's YouTube page was racking up millions of views. The exposure led Jordan to the attention of production team Stargate, who called her to fly to New York and record a few songs with them. While in the studio, rapper Jay-Z walked in, which ultimately resulted in Jordan becoming the first artist signed to the new, Sony Music-affiliated label, StarRoc/Roc Nation – a joint venture between Stargate and Jay-Z's Roc Nation label. Her debut single "Happiness" was released in September 2010 and topped the Hot Dance Club Songs chart in the United States and became a top-three hit in the United Kingdom and Australia. In Australia, "Happiness" was certified triple platinum by the Australian Recording Industry Association (ARIA), for shipments of 210,000 copies.

"Good Girl" was released as Jordan's second single in February 2011. The song debuted at No. 6 on the UK Singles Chart, giving Jordan her second top-10 hit in the United Kingdom. It also reached No. 15 in Ireland and became her second chart-topper on the Billboard Hot Dance Club Songs chart in April. Her self-titled debut album was released on February 25, 2011. It debuted on the UK Albums Chart at No. 9 and on the Australian Albums Chart at No. 11. "Hush Hush" was released as the album's third single on May 8, 2011.

Jordan also featured on Sean Paul's single "Got 2 Luv U", which reached number one in Switzerland and Bulgaria.

On December 28, 2013, Alexis confirmed that the lead single from her then-upcoming second studio album would be titled "Gone" and it would be released on March 1, 2014. Its video premiered the day before on Jordan's official YouTube channel.

Albums

Singles

Promotional singles

As featured artist

Guest appearances

Music videos

References

Jordan, Alexis